USS Finnegan (DE-307) was an  constructed for the United States Navy during World War II. She was sent off into the Pacific Ocean to protect convoys and other ships from Japanese submarines and fighter aircraft. She performed escort and antisubmarine operations in dangerous battle areas and returned home with three well-earned battle stars.

Namesake
William Michael Finnegan was born on 18 April 1897 in Bessemer, Michigan. He enlisted in the Navy on 22 October 1917, and served continuously, rising to Chief Radio Electrician on 8 November 1929. Appointed Ensign 18 November 1941, Chief Radio Electrician Finnegan was killed in action during the Japanese Attack on Pearl Harbor on 7 December 1941.

Construction and commissioning
Finnegan was launched on 22 February 1944 by Mare Island Navy Yard; sponsored by Mrs. Charles Schroeder, sister of Ensign Finnegan; and commissioned on 19 August 1944.

World War II Pacific Theater operations 
Finnegan arrived at Pearl Harbor on 8 November 1944 to serve as escort for submarines conducting training exercises prior to their war patrols. She voyaged to Midway Island escorting a transport between 11 and 20 December, then returned to duty with submarines until 9 January 1945. After amphibious training exercises in the Hawaiian Islands, Finnegan sailed escorting a group of LSTs and submarine chasers, two of which she towed for parts of the passage to Saipan.

Supporting the Iwo Jima operations 
On 15 February 1945, the escort ship sailed from Saipan for the assault on Iwo Jima, during which she screened transports as they launched their boats for the initial invasion on 19 February.

Sinking of Japanese Submarine I-370 
Radarman Perry was given $50.00 by the Captain for catching the early morning contact.

Supporting invasion of Okinawa operations
From Saipan, Finnegan screened the transports on to Espiritu Santo, arriving 15 March 1945. She sailed ten days later for Ulithi, the vast base from which the Okinawa assault was staged, and on 9 April, she reached the newly assaulted island. Sailing on anti-submarine patrols, as well as screening assault shipping, Finnegan fired to drive off a would-be suicide plane on 28 May. On 10 July she departed Okinawa for duty in the Philippines on local escort and patrol assignments until 15 September.

Post-War decommissioning 
Finnegan then sailed for Eniwetok, Pearl Harbor, and Charleston, South Carolina, where she was decommissioned and placed in reserve on 27 November 1945. She was sold for scrapping in June 1946.

Awards  
Finnegan received three battle stars for World War II service.

References

External links
 

Evarts-class destroyer escorts
World War II mine warfare vessels of the United States
Ships built in Vallejo, California
1944 ships